Elias Durnford (13 June 1739 – 21 June 1794) was a British army officer and civil engineer who is best known for surveying the town of Pensacola and laying out a city plan based on two public places (now the Plaza Ferdinand VII and the Seville Square).

Between 1769 and 1778 he was Lieutenant Governor of British West Florida and by 1794 Colonel Durnford was Chief Royal Engineer of the West Indies.

Early life
Elias Durnford was born in Ringwood, Hampshire, England on 13 June 1739.

Military service
Durnford served as an Ensign in the British army Corps of Royal Engineers, having signed up on 17 March 1759. In the Seven Years' War he participated in the Capture of Belle Île, France, 1761 and was also at the Battle of Havana (1762). After the Cuban action Lord Albemarle made him an Aide-de-camp. Durnford became an accomplished artist while on the Cuban campaign and engravings made from his sketches are highly valued.

After the Seven Years' War Durnford was posted to the newly established British colony of West Florida, where he was appointed chief engineer and surveyor general. To supplement his small salary he was paid for land surveying and as the colony was being divided into land grants he profited greatly from this arrangement.

Durnford laid out the city plan for Pensacola after arriving there in 1764. His plan for the city was classic in nature, centered on two squares, one for government and one for military drill and public affairs. Streets were all surveyed at right angles named after royal family members and government representatives. He included in the housing plan gardening plots on the north side of the city along Garden Street,

The location was also home to a military convalescent hospital, named Crofton. He designed a new port for the area, but the plan was never put into action. His design for a road to link Mobile to the colony's capital, Pensacola was more successful and was partly completed.

When the Governor of West Florida, John Eliot, hanged himself in 1769, Durnford was named Lieutenant Governor of the colony. While in England on 25 August 1769 Durnford married Rebecca Walker. The couple returned to British West Florida where he was Acting Governor until the new governor, Peter Chester, arrived on 10 August 1770. Durnford remained as Lieutenant Governor and was a member of the West Florida Council until 1778.

Durnford and his wife had a total of nine children, five sons and four daughters.

Durnford's duties changed with the outbreak of the American Revolutionary War. Spanish forces, allied with France and the American colonial rebels, moved to capture British West Florida. January 1780 found Durnford in command of Fort Charlotte in Mobile, an old French fort in disrepair that had been formerly known as Fort Conde. His force of 287 regulars and irregulars was opposed by a Spanish force of 2,000 troops, that arrived in Mobile Bay on 10 February 1780. Given that Durnford was greatly outnumbered the Spanish demanded the surrender of the British force, but Durnford refused, hoping for a relief force from Pensacola. The opposing commanders carried on protracted and polite negotiations over wine and cigars, while the Spanish prepared to take the old fort. Relief was not forthcoming and on 10 March 1780 Durnford surrendered, his estate having been burnt.

As part of the surrender to the Spanish commander Bernardo de Gálvez, Durnford received an agreement that his garrison would be accorded the honours of war and that the Spanish would not punish the people of the town for the defence. De Gálvez agreed but insisted that the armed colonists would be treated as prisoners of war. This was agreed and Spanish troops entered Fort Charlotte in August 1780. De Gálvez later captured Pensacola and the rest of West Florida in 1781.

Durnford and his family returned to Britain and he carried on his military career in the 1790s, campaigning against the French forces in Martinique, Guadeloupe and St. Lucia.

Death
Elias Durnford died from yellow fever on 21 June 1794 while on the island of Tobago.

References

External links
 Elements of Urbanism: Pensacola
 Image of Elías Durnford

1739 births
1794 deaths
American Revolutionary War prisoners of war held by the United States
Royal Engineers officers
British Army personnel of the American Revolutionary War
British Army personnel of the Seven Years' War
British prisoners of war in the American Revolutionary War
Governors of West Florida
Governors of British North America
People from Ringwood, Hampshire
Deaths from yellow fever